Dighalipukhuri; also Dighalipukhri is a rectangular man-made pond in Guwahati, about half a mile long. Dighalipukhuri is occupied altogether area of garden and pond between 17-18 bigha lands.

Legend
As per the legend constructed by the Brahmin pandits in the 16th or 17th century Yogini Tantra, its creation is credited to King Bhagadatta, who led the Kauravas in the Battle of Kurukshetra during the Mahabharata. The tank was dug by him during the svayamvara of his daughter, Bhanumati.

History

It was used by the Ahoms as a naval dockyard. Its access to the Brahmaputra was eventually closed, and during colonial times, that portion was further filled on which the Circuit House was built.  

Later, the Gauhati High Court building was built in the newly filled area.

Urban Legend
The VIP road of Dighalipukhuri have been claimed to be scary during night and can gave eerie feelings to travellers if someone travels there alone at night. Many people during late night walk have seen ghosts sitting at the top of Dighalipukhuri Park trees.

Dighalipukhuri Park Timing 
The Dighali Pukhuri Park opens at 8:30 AM and closes at 5.30 PM.

References

Bibliography

 

Lakes of Assam
Tourist attractions in Guwahati